Masasa Lindiwe Mbangeni is a South African actress. She is best known for her role as Thembeka Shezi in the popular television serial Scandal!.

Early life
She was born on 6 March 1987 in Port Elizabeth, South Africa. She later moved to Johannesburg for studies.

Career
She received the Mandela Rhodes scholarship to study in University of Witwatersrand and later graduated with her Bachelor of Arts Degree in Dramatic Arts specializing in Performance and Directing. She made guest appearances on two television serials: as 'Eunice' on the BBC crime drama Silent Witnesses and as 'Jackie’s personal assistant' on the M-Net soapie, Egoli. She also performed in three stage plays at the Johannesburg Market Theatre: Nogogo, Sundjata and Amen Corner, directed by James Ngcobo. In the meanwhile, she toured Grahamstown Festival of the Arts with the play Oedipus @ Koonu.

In 2013, she joined the cast of popular television serial Scandal! and played the role 'Thembeka Shezi'. The role became highly popular, even though, she left the role in 2016. However, she received two nominations for Best Actress in a TV Soap from the South African Film and Television Awards (SAFTA) in 2014 and 2015 for the role. At the same time, she received a nomination for Best Actress in the inaugural DStv Mzansi Magic Viewers Choice Award as well. After Scandal!, she appeared in the season two of thriller television series Thola telecast on the SABC2 channel. Then she played the role 'Celia' on the series Harvest. She later returned to the series and then the character was shot dead, making Mbangeni’s second exit from the show.

In 2011, she played in the feature film Machine Gun Preacher. Apart from acting, she took part in the Marie Claire naked campaign for 2015 to public awareness on sexual violence against women and children.

Filmography

References

External links
 

Living people
People from Port Elizabeth
South African television actresses
South African film actresses
Year of birth missing (living people)